Samarinda is the capital city of the Indonesian province of East Kalimantan on the island of Borneo. Samarinda ranks first on East Kalimantan Human Development Index and it is the most populous city on the entire Borneo island, with a population of 727,500 at the 2010 Census and 827,994 at the 2020 Census; the official estimate as at mid 2021 was 831,460.

Samarinda is East Kalimantan's largest exporter and fifth-largest importer. The city has the highest number of bank headquarters in East Kalimantan.

In 2021, Samarinda Harbour became the busiest passenger port in East Kalimantan.

Samarinda is known for its traditional food amplang, as well as the cloth sarung samarinda. The city center is on one side and the other side is named Samarinda Seberang.

Etymology
The name Samarinda originates from the description of the way in which the Bugis houses were constructed. At that time houses were customarily built on a raft and generally had the same height. This provided important social symbolism of equality between residents; no person's house, and thus no person, was seen as higher or lower than another. They named the settlement “Samarenda”, meaning “equally low”. After hundreds of years of use the pronunciation of the name changed slightly and the city became known as Samarinda.

History 
At the start of the Gowa War, the Dutch under Admiral Speelman's command attacked Makassar from the sea. Meanwhile, the Netherlands' Bugis ally Arung Palakka led a ground attack. The Kingdom of Gowa was forced to surrender and Sultan Hasanuddin was made to sign the Treaty of Bongaja on 19 November 1667.

The treaty did not quell all trouble for the Dutch however, since the Bugis from Gowa continued their struggle using guerilla tactics. Some Buginese moved to other islands close by such as Kalimantan. A few thousand people led by Lamohang Daeng Mangkona or Pua Ado I, moved to East Kalimantan, known then as Kutai, where they were welcomed by the local Sultan.

Samarinda was a small, sleepy town in 1942 with several small oil fields in the vicinity. It was occupied by the Japanese after the Dutch East Indies had fallen.

In 1955, the Apostolic Vicariate of Samarinda was established in the city.  In 1961, it was promoted as the Diocese of Samarinda.  In 2003, the diocese was promoted as the Metropolitan Archdiocese of Samarinda.

Administrative districts 
At the time of the 2010 Census, Samarinda City was divided into six districts (Indonesian: kecamatan), but four additional districts were subsequently created by splitting of existing ones. The ten districts are tabulated below with their areas and their populations at the 2010 Census and the 2020 Census, togethger with the official estimates as at mid 2021.

Notes: (a) the 2010 populations of Samarinda Kota and Sambutan Districts are included in the 2010 figure for Samarinda Ilir District, from which they were later split off. (b) the 2010 population of Loa Janan Ilir District is included in the figure for Samarinda Seberang District, from which it was later split off. (c) the 2010 population of Sungai Pinang District is included in the figure for Samarinda Utara District, from which it was later split off.

Climate
Samarinda has a tropical rainforest climate (Köppen Af) with heavy rainfall and hot, oppressively humid temperatures year-round. Hail is extremely rare, it was recorded on 21 November 2019.

Demographics

The territory's population in 2020 was 827,994 (422,624 male and 405,370 female), with an annual growth rate of 1.128% in 2019–2020. The majority of the people of Samarinda are of Native Indonesian and Chinese descent. There are also Americans, Canadians, Japanese and Koreans working in Samarinda. Life expectancy in Samarinda was 73.6 years as of 2014.

Religion

Samarinda's main religions are Islam, Christianity and Buddhism. The Christian community of around 89,000 forms about 10.2% of the total population; Protestants form a larger number than Roman Catholics at a rate of 10:3. There are also Hindu communities.

Economy

Since 2004, trade has been the engine of Samarinda's economic growth. It is also driven by the large amount of logging and oil extraction companies based there. Similar to Balikpapan, many national logging companies are based in Samarinda. There are many abandoned coal mines in Samarinda. Coal mining used to be very popular in Samarinda. However, the Indonesian government revoked many mining licenses due to the use of illegal chemicals and machinery.

Tourism sector also plays an important role in Samarinda's economy; it attracted over 2,000 international tourists and 1.2 million domestic tourists in 2019, making Samarinda the 2nd most popular tourists destination in East Kalimantan. In 2020, agriculture constituted only 2 per cent of GDP, and consists of growing flower varieties (rose, jasmine, orchid) and fruits (pomelo citrus fruit). Due to all these economical activities in Samarinda, it is one of the richest cities in East Kalimantan.

Transport 

The main transport infrastructure of Samarinda is different than every other cities in Kalimantan, characterised by less national government interference: Samarinda International Airport (East Kalimantan government), SkyTrain rapid transit project (public-private partnership), Sejuk Hill (Manggah Hill) Tunnel project (Samarinda Government) and Port of Palaran (private).

There are about 850,000 vehicles registered in Samarinda, the highest number of vehicles of any city in East Kalimantan. Samarinda has 3 bus terminals: Sungai Kunjang Bus Terminus, Lempake Bus Terminus and Seberang Bus Terminus.

Samarinda is connected by Trans-Kalimantan Highway Southern Route from Balikpapan to Samarinda; the highway runs in parallel with the first controlled-access expressway in Borneo, the Samarinda-Balikpapan Expressway, which is now under construction, and expected to be operational by the end of 2018.

APT Pranoto (Samarinda Sungai Siring, AAP) International Airport is the primary airport for the city and has been at Sungai Siring since 2018. With over 1 million passengers annually, it is one of East Kalimantan's busiest airports in terms of passenger and cargo movements. AAP is an important Australian passenger gateway for East Kalimantan's wildlife. AAP was built to replace Temindung Airport in Bandara, Sungai Pinang.

The prominent coal loading port of Tanjung Bara (TBCT) lies about 160 kilometres to the north of Samarinda.

Famous peoples

Adi Nugroho (footballer),

Aspar Aswin

 

Lerby Eliandry

Selvanus Geh

 
 
 

Abdul Kahar Mim
Denny Kantono

Korrie Layun Rampan
Lim Gunawan Hariyanto

Hadi Mulyadi

 

Sultan Samma
Joko Sidik
Chelsie Monica Ignesias Sihite

References

Citations

Sources

External links 

 GovSamarinda  Samarinda Government portal

 
Provincial capitals in Indonesia
Populated places in East Kalimantan